Lori McNeil was the defending champion but lost in the second round to Betsy Nagelsen.

Manon Bollegraf won in the final 6–4, 6–4 against Leila Meskhi.

Seeds
A champion seed is indicated in bold text while text in italics indicates the round in which that seed was eliminated.

  Lori McNeil (second round)
  Larisa Savchenko (second round)
  Raffaella Reggi (semifinals)
  Leila Meskhi (final)
  Ann Grossman (second round)
  Amy Frazier (quarterfinals)
  Dianne Balestrat (second round)
  Etsuko Inoue (semifinals)

Draw

External links
 1989 Virginia Slims of Oklahoma Draw

1989 Virginia Slims of Oklahoma – Singles
1989 WTA Tour